The Shenandoah was an American named passenger train of the Baltimore and Ohio Railroad (B&O), one of four daily B&O trains operating between Jersey City, New Jersey and Grand Central Station in Chicago, Illinois, via Washington, D.C. and Pittsburgh, Pennsylvania from the 1930s to the 1950s. Other B&O trains of that period on the route were the Capitol Limited, Columbian, and the Washington–Chicago Express. An alternate branch originated in Detroit and met with the Chicago part of the train at Deshler, Ohio, south of Toledo.

While the trains were advertised as beginning in New York City, they actually began in Jersey City at the Jersey Central's Jersey City terminal, where passengers were then transferred to buses that met the train right on the platform. These buses were ferried across the Hudson River into Manhattan, where they proceeded to various "stations." The Shenandoah operated to New York City via Philadelphia, Pennsylvania, until April 26, 1958, when the B&O discontinued passenger service north of Baltimore.

From the 1940s to the 1960s, the daily Shenandoah consisted of coaches, five Pullman sleeping cars, a lounge car with a radio, and a full-service dining car. Beginning in the early 1950s, the train also had a Strata-Dome combination sleeper-dome car on alternate days.

The westbound Shenandoah, operating as Train #7, left Washington at 11:30 p.m. (several hours after the 5 p.m. departure of the Capitol Limited and Columbian from the nation's capital), making it a favorite of travelers seeking convenient connections with other railroads in Chicago, including the streamliners of the Santa Fe and Union Pacific Railroads. The train also carried a heavy volume of mail and express, with "head-end" equipment such as Railway Post Office cars a regular part of the Shenandoahs consist. Beginning on January 16, 1954, the train includes a transcontinental sleeping car from Washington, continuing past Chicago on the Santa Fe Railway's Super Chief. (For the eastbound trip this was carried on the Capitol Limited.) On January 12, 1958, the Baltimore & Ohio terminated the transcontinental sleeper car.

It had its final run in a truncated Akron, Ohio to Washington, D.C. itinerary with the end of B&O passenger service on April 30, 1971.

Amtrak revived the name in the 1970s for the short-lived Shenandoah, a Washington–Cincinnati train.

Schedule
In 1961, westbound Shenandoah Train # 7 operated on the following schedule (departure times at principal stops shown):

References

Named passenger trains of the United States
Passenger trains of the Baltimore and Ohio Railroad
Passenger rail transportation in Illinois
Passenger rail transportation in Indiana
Passenger rail transportation in Maryland
Passenger rail transportation in Ohio
Passenger rail transportation in Pennsylvania
Passenger rail transportation in Washington, D.C.
Passenger rail transportation in West Virginia
Transportation in Chicago
Transportation in Baltimore
Transportation in Pittsburgh
Night trains of the United States
Railway services discontinued in 1967